Cataxia colesi is a species of spider native to south-western Australia. The species has an extremely small distribution range, restricted to individual sky islands in the Stirling Range National Park. It digs burrows up to 20 cm deep.

References

Idiopidae
Spiders of Australia
Arthropods of Western Australia
Spiders described in 2017